Warrior Soul is the tenth studio album of the German female hard rock singer Doro Pesch. It was released worldwide in 2006 by AFM Records.

The recording of the album took a prolonged time, due to singer Doro Pesch filming the movie Anuk – Der Weg des Kriegers, starring as 'Meha'. The film was shot in Switzerland in 2005 and directed by Luke Gasser. The song "Warrior Soul" is included in the movie soundtrack and Gasser is credited as co-producer of the album, which was partially recorded in Switzerland with session musicians.

The album was published also as an enhanced CD with different bonus tracks and multimedia sections. It was also published in a boxed Winter edition, containing a bonus disc of unreleased and live tracks and other gadgets.

The album reached position No. 27 on the German Longplay chart.

Track listing

Digibook edition has a multimedia section.

Personnel

Band members
 Doro Pesch – vocals
 Nick Douglas – bass, keyboards, backing vocals
 Joe Taylor – guitars, backing vocals
 Johnny Dee – drums, backing vocals
 Oliver Palotai – keyboards, guitars, backing vocals

Additional musicians
 Steve 'Hef' Häflinger – guitars
 Oli Häller – drums
 Tim Husung – drums
 Thomi Imhof – bass
 Chris Lietz – guitars, keyboards
 Torsten Sickert – guitars, keyboards, bass
 Klaus Vanscheidt – guitars

Production
 Luke Gasser – associate producer on tracks 2, 3, 5, 6, 8
 Deezl Imhof – associate producer, engineer, mixing on tracks 2, 3, 5, 6, 8,
 Chris Lietz – producer, engineer, mixing
 Doro Pesch – producer
 Torsten Sickert – producer

References

External links
American site

Doro (musician) albums
2006 albums
AFM Records albums